Pavlov Ballet is first ballet company incorporated outside Russia. Founded by Dmitri Pavlov in 1992 and incorporated in England and Wales in 1997. Company led by Ella Gusova (company director) and Alla Chachina (artistic director). Pavlov Ballet's first season in the UK began in September 1998 and concluded in June 1999. The company repertoire included Giselle, Grand Pas from Paquita, Les Sylphide and a number of variations and Pas De Dux from various ballets. 
The progress of the company was closely followed by the media: BBC, HTV, Womans own magazine, Independent Sunday magazine among a few. BBC Radio 4 covered the pre season launch and later BBC Europe Direct ran a feature.
After a successful season the company was sold to Grand Theatre Swansea where it continued under a different name Swansea Ballet Russe. 

The company featured several lead dancers in the role of Giselle: Elena Alexeeva, Julia Papejeva and Marina Filippova. Marina Filippova and Chika Temma were cast as Myrtha. On larger size stages the ballet was performed where the Peasant Pas de Dux was included and featured either Chika Temma or Elena Chikasheva partnered by Juri Demakov. The part of Count Albert was danced by Aleksandr Mishenko and Andrey Stelmakhov. The peasant pas de dux male partner was Juri Demakov.

Previously to Pavlov Ballet Alla Chachina and Ella Gusova produced plays for local theatres. Pavlov Ballet was an ambitious project as it involved raising the funding, obtaining work permits for eleven dancers, booking and promoting the tour. 
Alla and Ella come from opera and ballet theatre background. Their father Vladislav Chachin was an opera conductor and worked as a principal in many Russian opera houses including Kirov (Marinsky) theatre.

External links 
 Sasha Gusov, The Breakaway Bolshoi, The Independent, 13 December 1998
Full Repertoire:

Giselle - ballet in two acts by Adam

Grand Pas from Paquita - a one act ballet. Music by Minkus

Les Sylphide - a one act ballet to music by Chopin

Pas De Dux - Don Quixote music by Minkus

Pas De Dux - Swan lake (black swan) music by Tchaikovsky

Pas De Dux - Le Corsaire music by Adam

Pas De Dux - Raymonda music by Glazunov

Slave Pas De Dux - Le Corsaire music by Adam

Adagio from Sleeping Beauty music by Tchaikovsky

Adagio from Spring Waters music by Kobekin

Baba Yaga - a choreographic miniature music by Mussorgsky

The Lady and the Hooligan - a choreographic miniature music by Shostakovich

Diana and Actaeon - a pas de dux from the ballet Esmeralda. Music by Pugni

Adagio Swan Lake (white Swan) music by Tchaikovsky

Ballet companies in the United Kingdom
Performing groups established in 1992